Saint James or St. James may refer to:

People

Saints
James, brother of Jesus (died 62 or 69), also known as  James the Just
James the Great (died 44), Apostle, also known as James, son of Zebedee, or Saint James the Greater
James, son of Alphaeus (died c. 62), Apostle, also known as James the Less
James the Less, possibly the same as the son of Alphaeus or the brother of Jesus
James Intercisus (died 421), also known as St James the Mutilated
James the Deacon (died after 671), Roman deacon and missionary to England
Saint James Matamoros (9th cent., or Saint James the Moor-slayer
James of the Marches (died 1476), papal legate and inquisitor.
Venerable James of Sclavonia, Croatian monk who was prone to ecstasies, worked miracles and levitated

People with the surname
Rebecca St. James (born 1977), Australian Christian singer and actress
Simone St. James (born 19??), Canadian author
Susan Saint James (born 1946), American actress and activist
Lyn St. James (born 1947), American racecar driver

Places

Australia
St James, New South Wales
St James, Victoria
St James, Western Australia

Canada
St. James-Assiniboia, Winnipeg
Saint James Parish, New Brunswick
St. James (electoral district), Quebec, 1892–1952
St. James (provincial electoral district), Manitoba
St. James Town, Toronto, Ontario

United Kingdom
 St James's, a district in the City of Westminster, London
 St James's Street
 Westminster St James, or St James Piccadilly, a former civil parish
 St. James End, Northampton, also known as St. James
 St James' Park, football stadium in Newcastle Upon Tyne

United States
St. James, Arkansas
St. James City, Florida
Saint James, Illinois
Saint James, Indiana
St. James, Louisiana
St. James Parish, Louisiana
St. James, Maryland
St. James, Michigan
St. James, Minnesota
St. James, Missouri
St. James, Nebraska
St. James, New York
Saint James District
St. James, North Carolina
Saint James, Ohio
St. James Township (disambiguation)

Other countries
 Saint James, Barbados
 Saint-James, Manche département, France
 Saint James Airfield
 St James, Guernsey
 Saint James Parish, Jamaica
 St James Station, New Zealand
 St James, Cape Town, South Africa
 Saint James, Trinidad and Tobago

Other uses
 Court of St James's, the court of the British sovereign for diplomatic purposes
 St. James Court Art Show, or just St. James, held annually in Louisville, Kentucky, U.S.
 , the name of two Royal Navy ships

See also
 
 
 
 
 
 
 St. James's Hospital (disambiguation)
 St. James Academy (disambiguation)
 St. James' Church (disambiguation)
 St James College (disambiguation)
 St James's House (disambiguation)
 St. James Infirmary (disambiguation)
 St James Park (disambiguation)
 Saint James Parish (disambiguation)
 St. James School (disambiguation)
 Saint James station (disambiguation)
 St James Street (disambiguation)
 St James Theatre (disambiguation)
 James (disambiguation)
 St Jimmy, a character from the album and Broadway musical American Idiot
 Saint Jacques (disambiguation)
 San Diego (disambiguation)
 Santiago (disambiguation)
 St James the Great (disambiguation)
 St. Jacob (disambiguation), means "St. James"